Testimony is a 1920 British silent drama film directed by Guy Newall and starring Ivy Duke, David Hawthorne and Mary Rorke. It was based on the novel of the same title by Alice and Claude Askew.

Plot
As summarized in a film publication, a farmer, Gilian Lyons (Hawthorne), lives with his mother Rachel Lyons (Rorke), who is tyrannical in her devotion to her son. Gilian braves his mother s anger and marries Althea May (Duke), who moves in with them. Rachel, who had been training Lucinda (Everest) for eventual marriage to her son, vents her spleen against Althea. Gilian and Althea have a daughter who dies, and Rachel says this was because Althea did not take care of her. Althea leaves, lives with an uncle, and enters society, but she later decides to return home, as she still loves Gilian. However, Gilian has left the farm in search of her. After she becomes ill, Rachel takes care of Althea, and their relationship improves. Eventually Gilian returns home to find his wife waiting for him.

Cast
 Ivy Duke as Althea May 
 David Hawthorne as Gilian Lyons 
 Lawford Davidson as Cecil Coram 
 Mary Rorke as Rachel Lyons 
 Douglas Munro as Reuben Curtis 
 Marie Wright as Lizzie Emmett 
 Barbara Everest as Lucinda 
 Ruth Mackay as Lady Yetty

References

Bibliography
 Low, Rachael. History of the British Film, 1918-1929. George Allen & Unwin, 1971.

External links

1920 films
1920 drama films
British drama films
British silent feature films
British black-and-white films
Films directed by Guy Newall
Films based on British novels
1920s English-language films
1920s British films
Silent drama films